Letsitele is a small town situated in the Limpopo province of South Africa. It is a farming district, primarily citrus, tobacco, beef cattle and other fruits.

References

Populated places in the Greater Tzaneen Local Municipality